Sorrow is the worst thing in life ... is the first line, and name, of a poem written in Irish, as an elegy for Féilim Mac Maghnusa Méig Uidhir, who died in 1487. He was a brother of Cathal Óg Mac Maghnusa.

The author of the poem is unknown. It is found on folio 15 verso of TCD 1282, which consists for the most part of the Annals of Ulster, compiled by Féilim's brother, Cathal Óg. It consists of thirty-two quatrains written in two columns in the strict form of rannaigheacht mhór.

References
Elegy on Féilim Mac Maghnusa Méig Uidhir ob. 1487, Brian Ó Cuív, Celtica 23, pp. 261–68, 1999

Medieval poetry
Irish poems
Early Irish poetry
Irish literature
Irish-language literature
15th-century poems